Julian Calor (born 27 January 1997) is a Dutch professional footballer who plays as a midfielder for SV TEC.

Club career
After spells with Willem II and Brabant United, Calor joined Vitesse from RKC Waalwijk in July 2016. After appearing on the bench in Vitesse's 3–1 victory over Twente, Calor made his debut in Vitesse's following game against Groningen, which resulted in a 1–1 draw. Following these two first-team appearances, Calor failed to appear in Vitesse's 2017–18 and predominantly featured in their reserve side instead before leaving in July 2018.

On 24 May 2018, Calor agreed to join Eerste Divisie side Cambuur on a one-year deal, with an option of an extra year.

Career statistics

Honours

Club
Vitesse
 KNVB Cup: 2016–17

References

External links
 
 

1997 births
Living people
Footballers from Gorinchem
Association football midfielders
Dutch footballers
Eredivisie players
Eerste Divisie players
Willem II (football club) players
RKC Waalwijk players
SBV Vitesse players
SC Cambuur players
SV TEC players